The Deduru Oya Dam is an embankment dam built across the Deduru River in Kurunegala District of Sri Lanka. Built in 2014, the primary purpose of the dam is to retain approximately a billion cubic metres of water for irrigation purposes, which would otherwise flow out to sea. Site studies of the dam began in 2006 and construction started in 2008. It was ceremonially completed in 2014, with the presence of the then President Mahinda Rajapaksa.

Site studies and design of the dam was done by engineers from the Ministry of Irrigation.

In addition to the eight sluice gates, water from the reservoir is channelled from the reservoir (for irrigation) via three canals, namely the Left Canal, Central Canal, and the South Canal.

See also 

 List of dams and reservoirs in Sri Lanka
 List of power stations in Sri Lanka

References

External links 
 

Deduru Oya
Embankment dams
Hydroelectric power stations in Sri Lanka
Dams completed in 2014
Buildings and structures in North Western Province, Sri Lanka